The American Woolen Mill Housing District is a residential historic district at 300–328 Market Street in Lawrence, Massachusetts.  It consists of nine three story multiunit tenements built in the first decade of the 20th century.  They are situated in a roughly oval pattern around a central courtyard, a distinctive pattern designed to provide open space while maximizing housing density.  The property was designed by local architect James E. Allen, and had features unusual for tenements, including gas heat and indoor plumbing.

The district was listed on the National Register of Historic Places in 1982.

See also
American Woolen Company Townhouses, located nearby
National Register of Historic Places listings in Lawrence, Massachusetts
National Register of Historic Places listings in Essex County, Massachusetts

References

Historic districts in Essex County, Massachusetts
National Register of Historic Places in Lawrence, Massachusetts
Historic districts on the National Register of Historic Places in Massachusetts
Company housing